Series 48 of University Challenge began on 16 July 2018 on BBC Two.

Results
Winning teams are highlighted in bold.
Teams with green scores (winners) returned in the next round, while those with red scores (losers) were eliminated.
Teams with orange scores had to win one more match to return in the next round.
Teams with yellow scores indicate that two further matches had to be played and won (teams that lost their first quarter-final match).
A score in italics indicates a match decided on a tie-breaker question.

First round

Highest scoring losers play-offs

Second round

Quarter-finals

Semi-finals

Final

In what was the most closely contested final University Challenge had seen for the past decade, St Edmund Hall, Oxford had leads of 40 to -5 and 80 to 40 before Edinburgh fought back to take a commanding 125 to 70 lead with around seven minutes left. St Edmund Hall, however, mounted a comeback of their own and took a 5 point lead with under a minute remaining. However, Campbell Hewson (Edinburgh) correctly answered the difficult ensuing starter question, identifying that the first three letters of the birthplace of William Gladstone, Beryl Bainbridge and Wayne Rooney (LIV of Liverpool) equalled 54 when spelt using roman numerals, to give Edinburgh a 5 point lead of their own. Edinburgh then successfully answered two bonus questions and allowed the clock to run down sufficiently to snatch victory.

 The trophy and title were awarded to the University of Edinburgh team comprising Matt Booth, Marco Malusà, Max Fitz-James and Robbie Campbell Hewson.
 The Edinburgh team are the first Scottish champions in the Paxman era and the first since 1983.
 The trophy was presented by Sebastian Faulks.

Spin-off: Christmas Special 2018

First round
Each year, a Christmas special sequence is aired featuring distinguished alumni. Out of 7 first-round winners, the top 4 highest-scoring teams progress to the semi-finals. The teams consist of celebrities who represent their alma maters.
Winning teams are highlighted in bold.
Teams with green scores (winners) returned in the next round, while those with red scores (losers) were eliminated.
Teams with grey scores won their match but did not achieve a high enough score to proceed to the next round.
A score in italics indicates a match decided on a tie-breaker question.

Standings for the winners

Semi-finals

Final

The winning Peterhouse, Cambridge team consisted of Dan Mazer, Mark Horton, Michael Howard and Michael Axworthy beat the University of Bristol and their team of Philip Ball, Laura Wade, Misha Glenny and Iain Stewart.

References

External links
University Challenge homepage
Blanchflower Results Table

2018
2018 British television seasons
2019 British television seasons